Three Loves Has Nancy is a 1938 romantic comedy film directed by Richard Thorpe and starring Janet Gaynor, Robert Montgomery and Franchot Tone. It is set in New York City.

Plot
The seduction plans of novelist Malcolm Niles go awry when actress Vivian Herford brings along her mother to a candlelight dinner in his New York apartment. When they talk of marriage, Malcolm decides to make a tour promoting his new book, and in a small southern town meets Nancy Briggs at an autographing session at the local bookstore. Nancy is getting married that night, but her fiancé, working in New York, doesn't come back for the wedding, so her family gives her the fare to go to New York to find him. At the same time, Malcolm gets a wire from his publisher and friend, Robert Hanson, telling him to come home because Vivian has left town. Traveling to New York on the same train, Nancy proves to be a pest who Malcolm hopes to avoid once they arrive, but when Nancy can't find her fiancé, she goes to Malcolm, since he's the only one she knows in the city. He is about to kick her out when Vivian returns, so he uses Nancy as an excuse to get rid of Vivian. Further comedy ensues.

Cast
 Janet Gaynor as Nancy Briggs
 Robert Montgomery as Mal Niles
 Franchot Tone as Bob Hanson
 Guy Kibbee as Pa Briggs
 Claire Dodd as Vivian Herford
 Reginald Owen as William
 Cora Witherspoon as Mrs. Herford
 Emma Dunn as Mrs. Briggs
 Charley Grapewin as Grandpa Briggs
 Lester Matthews as Alonzo Stewart
 Grady Sutton as George Wilkins, Jr.
 Mary Forbes as Mrs. Hanson
 Grant Withers as Jack
 Charles Lane as Cleaning Store Manager (uncredited)

References

External links
 
 
 
 

1938 films
1930s English-language films
1938 romantic comedy films
American black-and-white films
Films directed by Richard Thorpe
Metro-Goldwyn-Mayer films
Films set in New York City
American romantic comedy films
1930s American films